The 1941 Chicago Cardinals season was the 22nd season the team was in the league. The team improved on their previous output of 2–7–2, winning three games. They failed to qualify for the playoffs for the 16th consecutive season.

Schedule

Note: Intra-division opponents are in bold text.

Standings

References

1941
Chicago Cardinals
Chicago Cardinals